The Ven. Ernest Judd Barnett (1859–1955) was Archdeacon of Hong Kong from 1910 to 1925.

He was educated at Trinity College, Melbourne and ordained in  1886.

After curacies in Kew and North Melbourne he was Headmaster of Caulfield Grammar School.

He was Warden of St Stephen's College, Hong Kong before his appointment as Archdeacon; and Rector of Beer Hackett with Thornford afterwards.

See also

 List of Caulfield Grammar School people

References

1859 births
People from Melbourne
University of Melbourne alumni
Archdeacons of Hong Kong
1955 deaths